Tom von Prince (9 January 1866 – 4 November 1914) was a German East Africa Company military officer and plantation owner in German East Africa. He most notably, as a captain in the Schutztruppe, led the first action by German forces in East Africa during World War I by seizing Taveta on 15 August 1914, and was then killed in November at the Battle of Tanga.

Early life 
He was born on 9 January 1866, son of Thomas Henry Prince, a Scotsman and the British police governor of the British island colony of Mauritius and a German mother. With the early death of his father, his mother returned to Germany. After he was orphaned, von Prince and his sister were educated in England. Later his mother's family brought him to Germany, and entered him into the Kassel Military Academy (Kadettenanstalt Kassel) for young Prussian male aristocrats in Legnica (Liegnitz), Silesia. He was classmates with his future superior Paul von Lettow-Vorbeck. He also met his future wife Magdalene von Massow here.

Military career 
In 1887 he joined the Imperial German Army and served in the Prussian Infantry Regiment No. 99, which was stationed near Strasbourg. In 1889 he retired from the army as a lieutenant; and in 1890 joined the Kaiserliche Schutztruppe, initially called the Wissmann Truppe, from which developed the protective force for German East Africa. By 1890, Tom von Prince was involved in German East Africa as a lieutenant attempting to control 'the Street of Caravans' under control of the Wissmann Truppe. In East Africa, Prince initially participated in the suppression of the coastal insurgency. In the following years he commanded military expeditions to subjugate the Hehe people. Since the Hehe, under Chief Mkwawa, had only attacked and harassed the Germans, leading to the loss of Commander Emil von Zelewski and many of his men, Tom Prince was sent far inland to Lake Nyassa, with a civilian representative of the Antislavery Committee, Wynecken. Here he met Wissmann, who lent him Bauer, the Wissmann's safari leader. The three, Prince, Wynecken, and Bauer, were to encircle the Hehe under Mkwawa, with the help of more than 20 Atongas and thousand Sangu soldiers sworn enemy of the Hehe tribe. He persecuted the ruler, Chief Mkwawa, until he finally defeated him and made him flee his capital; he died in the wilderness later.

Prince interrupted his service in Africa by several stays in Germany. There he married Magdalene von Massow, who went with him to Africa. In 1896 he was promoted to the rank of captain. Prince also worked in the district authorities of German East Africa, including as government commissioner at Nyassa Lake and later in the region of Iringa, where he was responsible for the "pacification" of the Hehe people in 1898. Around 1900, Prince left the protective force and colonial administration to settle as landowner in East Africa. Together with his wife, he founded a plantation near Sakkarani in the Usambara Mountains. In 1906, Captain von Prince was raised to the German nobility.

World War I and Tanga 
At the outbreak of the First World War Prince returned to active military service and commanded two European companies of the German Schutztruppe. He was recalled to active duty as Hauptmann (captain) and given command of the Askaris of the 13th Field Company and of the 7th and 8th Schützenkompanien (rifle companies composed mainly of the sons of German settlers). Prince's exploits earned him the nickname Bwana Sakarani — the wild one — from his Askaris.

On 15 August 1914, in the opening move of the war in East Africa, von Prince seized the Kenyan town of Taveta on orders from the commander of German forces, Paul von Lettow-Vorbeck. The objective was to take and hold a key point that would strengthen German defences in the north of their colony and protect the Usambara Railway.

Tom von Prince was one of nine German officers to be killed in the Battle of Tanga on 4 November 1914. He had been ordered to lead his troops into the centre of the town and was killed in fighting against the British 2nd Loyal North Lancashire Regiment that had landed as part of the British Indian Expeditionary Force. His funeral took place together with twelve other German officers in Tanga.

References

Works 
 Tom von Prince: Gegen Araber und Wahehe – Erinnerungen aus meiner ostafrikanischen Leutnantszeit 1890–1895. Mittler, Berlin 1914

Literature 
 Herbert Viktor Patera: Der weiße Herr Ohnefurcht – Das Leben des Schutztruppenhauptmanns Tom von Prince. Deutscher Verlag, Berlin 1939.
 Hans Schmiedel: "Bwana Sakkarani – Der Schutztruppenhauptmann Tom von Prince und seine Zeit". Handschriftliches Manuskript

1866 births
1914 deaths
German military personnel killed in World War I
Colonial people of German East Africa
German untitled nobility
Schutztruppe personnel
German people of Scottish descent